Brothel Lights is a Russian film directed by Alexander Gordon, a screen version of the same story by Harry Gordon.

The film premiered on June 11, 2011 at the Kinotavr Film Festival, and was released on November 3, 2011.

Plot
Set in Odessa at the end of the 1950s, it is a story about an independent-minded woman who disregards the opinions of others. The main character is Lyuba, the owner of a small brothel. Working for her are two girls, Zinka and Zygota. The son of the prosecutor Arkasha is in love with Lyuba, but she loves the poet Adam.

Production
Gordon shot and edited the film in 2007, but was unable to complete it until 2011.

Cast
 Oksana Fandera as Lyuba
 Alexey Levinsky as Adam
 Ada Rogovtseva as Yefrosinya Petrovna,   Lyuba's mother
 Anna Slyu as  Zygota 
 Katerina Shpitsa as Zinka
 Christian Jereghi as Arkasha
 Bogdan Stupka as Zaslavsky, prosecutor
 Yevgeny Tsyganov as  Valera
Natalia Fisson as Zaslavsky's wife
Mikhail Golubovich as Wilhelm

Awards and nominations
Golden Eagle Award
Best Actress (Oksana Fandera) — nominated
Nika Awards 
Best Actress (Oksana Fandera) — nominated
Pacific Meridian
Audience Choice Award	in Best Russian Film — won
 Russian Guild of Film Critics  Award
Best Actress (Oksana Fandera) — nominated
 Kinotavr
 Special Jury Diploma (Oksana Fandera)

References

External links
 

Russian drama films
Films based on Russian novels
Mosfilm films
Films set in 1958
Films about prostitution in Russia
2011 drama films
2011 films